Penybont is a small village in the  community of Genau'r-glyn, Ceredigion, Wales, which is 77.6 miles (124.9 km) from Cardiff and 178.8 miles (287.7 km) from London. Penybont is represented in the Senedd by Elin Jones (Plaid Cymru) and is part of the Ceredigion constituency in the House of Commons.

Etymology
The name Penybont derives from the Welsh language and means "Bridge's head".

References

See also
List of localities in Wales by population

Villages in Ceredigion